Samoeng Nuea is a tambon (sub-district) of Samoeng District, in Chiang Mai Province, Thailand. In 2005 it had a population of 3,426 people. The tambon contains six villages. It lies 73 km northwest of Chiang Mai.

References

External links

Tambon of Chiang Mai province
Populated places in Chiang Mai province